Michael Howells (13 January 1957 – 19 July 2018) was an English Production Designer, Set Designer, Creative Director and respected designer who worked across film, fashion, theatre and television.

Howells started as an Assistant Art Director on The Cook, the Thief, His Wife & Her Lover, where he worked with fashion designer Jean Paul Gaultier. Known particularly for his work in fashion with John Galliano, his work was seen in the films Orlando (1992), Emma (1995), and Nanny McPhee (2005). He was the production designer for the first two series of ITV's Victoria (2016–2017).

Howells collaborated with Galliano on his own label and at Dior, Christian Lacroix, Alexander McQueen on shows; photographers Mario Testino and Nick Knight on editorial and advertising including many editions of Vogue and advertising campaigns for Dior, Burberry and Dolce and Gabbana. He also designed Stephen Jones's award-winning V&A exhibition 'Hat's An Anthology by Stephen Jones' in 2009.

Film credits include Bright Young Things, Shackleton, About Time Too, and Miss Julie. Howells' theatre design credits include Ed Hall's acclaimed ‘Chariots of Fire’ [costumes], MSM/DV8 Physical Theatre at The Royal Court, 'Towards Poetry' for The Royal Ballet, 'Derdemon' for the Statsoper, Berlin, 'Julius Tomb’ for Mark Baldwin Company, and 'Constant Speed', celebrating Einstein's Centenary, for the Rambert Ballet, 2005, where he was made Associate Designer at Rambert in 2009.

Howells was the Creative Director behind the iconic Christmas trees at Claridges, where each year a fashion designer creates a tree.  He created the inaugural tree in 2009 for John Galliano at Christian Dior, and in 2010 for Dior, 2019 for Sir Jony Ives and Marc Newson, and in 2017 for Karl Lagerfeld.

He received a BAFTA nomination for his work on Shackleton.

References

External links 
http://www.michaelhowellsstudio.com/
Michael Howells on Production Design
Michael Howells as a guest on Episode 5 of Baroque In Britain on BBC Radio 4

1957 births
2018 deaths
English designers